The Aprilia SL1000 Falco (also known as "Aprilia SL Mille"), is a  sports motorcycle  powered by a liquid-cooled Rotax 998 cc 60° V-twin engine, manufactured  from 1999 to 2005 by Aprilia in Noale, Italy. The Falco's  engine was a detuned version of the  RSV Mille engine.  The Falco's dual exhausts and remapped fuel injection reduced peak power slightly but bolstered bottom and mid-range. The Falco has a half-fairing, a twin-beam alloy frame, 53 mm USD forks from Showa (& later Marzocchi) and twin Brembo 320 mm semi-floating front brake discs.  The clutch simulated a slipper clutch using a device activated by inlet manifold vacuum.  

The Falco was not as radical as the "race-replica' Mille nor really a sports-tourer (such as their own Aprilia Futura) but, rather like the Yamaha TRX850, was instead a sporty half-faired roadster which competed in the market against the Honda VTR1000 and the Suzuki TL1000S.  Although the Falco proved to be reliable and powerful, sales were disappointing and production ceased in 2003, with sales continuing into 2004.  

A Motor Cycle News review of the Falco declared: "Less is sometimes more. By making its roadster less extreme than the RSV Mille sportster it's based on, Aprilia broadened its appeal and produced a motorcycle that's both easier and more fun to ride."

Specifications

References

SL1000 Falco
Sport bikes
Motorcycles introduced in 1999